Jakarta Elevated Toll Road is six all-elevated toll roads in Jakarta with an exclusive (dedicated) public transportation lane and connect to Jakarta Inner Ring Toll Road with total length of .

Phase development
The six Jakarta inner toll road segment project is broken down into three stages. The first stage is currently under construction, and as for the second and third stages, the construction will be carried out in parallel.

 The first phase construction is started since February 2017, the project construction is set to complete by 2022. The first stage is divided into three sections, which are section A covering Kelapa Gading—Pulo Gadung spanning , section B covering Semanan—Grogol spanning , and section C covering Grogol—Kelapa Gading spanning .
The second stage covering Duri Pulo—Kampung Melayu spanning  and Kemayoran—Kampung Melayu spanning  is targeted to be in operation by early 2021.
The third stage covering Ulujami—Tanah Abang spanning 8.70 kilometres and Pasar Minggu—Kasablanca spanning 9.16 kilometres is set to be operational by mid-2022.

Phase 1
In January 2014, Environmental Impact Assessment (Analisa Mengenai Dampak Lingkungan/AMDAL) has been finished and ready to the next step development.

Semanan-Sunter Toll Road

Kelapa Gading-Pulo Gebang Toll Road

Phase 2

Duri Pulo-Kampung Melayu Toll Road

Kampung Melayu-Kemayoran Toll Road

Phase 3

Ulujami-Tanah Abang

Phase 4

Pasar Minggu-Casablanca Toll Road

Public transportation lane
All the elevated toll roads will have an exclusive (dedicated) public transportation lane, two lanes for public and one lane for TransJakarta.

Right to Match
The tender use Right to Match system, so the lowest bidder is not directly become the winner, because the lowest bidder value will be offered to Jakarta Administration consortium first with the lowest bidder value, if the consortium agree, so the lowest bidder become a loser. The prominent PT Jasa Marga which operates many toll roads has expressed not to follow the tender.

On 19 December 2012, a consortium is named Jakarta Tollroad Development has been built consists of:
 PT Jakarta Propertindo
 Pembangunan Jaya Group
 PT Hutama Karya
 PT Pembangunan Perumahan Tbk (IDX: PTPP)
 PT Wijaya Karya Tbk (IDX: WIKA)
 PT Adhi Karya Tbk (IDX: ADHI)
 PT Citra Marga Nursaphala Persada Tbk (IDX: CMNP)

Contra
One transportation expert say that the elevated toll roads will not ease a much the congestion due to most of the elevated toll roads will touch or parallel with the current routes.

See also
Jakarta Inner Ring Road
Jakarta Outer Ring Road
Jakarta Outer Ring Road 2

References 

Toll roads in Java